Georgina Black (born ) is a Scottish female weightlifter, competing in the 63 kg category. She represented Scotland at the 2014 Commonwealth Games in the 63 kg event. She also competed in the 2013 Commonwealth Championships, the 2013 10th International "ASVO-NO" Women's Grand Prix, and the 2011 Commonwealth Championships.

Black has dropping a number of bodyweight divisions, from 75 kg in 2011, to 69 kg in 2013 and 63 kg in 2014, necessitating considerable personal weight loss whilst maintaining her ability to lift.

Major competitions

References

1989 births
Living people
Scottish female weightlifters
Place of birth missing (living people)
Weightlifters at the 2014 Commonwealth Games
Commonwealth Games competitors for Scotland